Ministry of Energy ( Vezârat-e Niru), Government regulates and manages the implementation of policies applicable to energy, electricity, water and wastewater services in Iran.

History and profile
Developed on 17 October 1936 (before the current constitution of Iran (1979)), the ministry was established to provide electricity to the city of Tehran. On 20 May 1943 (before the current constitution of Iran (1979)), its portfolio was expanded to include water management in the country. It was later renamed as the ministry of water and electricity on 17 March 1964. Later on 17 February 1975, after the parliamentary approval it became the ministry of energy. On 10 May 1978, under energy minister Jahanguir Mahdmina, the ministry's function was expanded to contain the construction and operation of nuclear power plants in the country.

After the new Iranian constitution was formed (1979) some parliamentary changes took place for the duties of this ministry. On 12 July 1980, some of the functions of the ministry were given to the ministry of agriculture. On 7 March 1983, water management, and fair distribution of water resources were made part of the ministry of energy.

Ministry of Energy is responsible for the management of supply and regulating the demand of water, electricity, energy, and wastewater services. It also promotes goods and services training, research and technological advancement, and rooting. The Ministry also plays a major role in the preservation of natural resources in Iran, environmental science, public health promotion, welfare and self-sufficiency for sustainable development of the country.

The ministry has been on the sanction list of the European Union since 16 October 2012.

Deputies
The ministry consists of five deputy Ministers as follows: 
Deputy for Research and Human Resources
Deputy for Planning and Economic Affairs
Deputy for Electricity and Energy
Deputy for Water and Wastewater
Deputy for Support, Legal, and Parliamentary Affairs

Ministers since 1979 
The last energy minister before the 1979 Iranian revolution was Jahanguir Mahdmina.

The energy ministers of Iran after the 1979 Iranian revolution:

See also
 Energy in Iran
 List of reservoirs and dams in Iran
 Water supply and sanitation in Iran
 List of power stations in Iran

References

External links

Ministry of Energy News Agency

1936 establishments in Iran
Energy
Iran, Energy
Iran